Baratala is a village and a gram panchayat, in Khejuri II CD Block in Contai subdivision of Purba Medinipur district in the state of West Bengal, India.

Geography

Location

Urbanisation
93.55% of the population of Contai subdivision live in the rural areas. Only 6.45% of the population live in the urban areas and it is considerably behind Haldia subdivision in urbanization, where 20.81% of the population live in urban areas.

Note: The map alongside presents some of the notable locations in the subdivision. All places marked in the map are linked in the larger full screen map.

Demographics
As per 2011 Census of India Baratala had a total population of 3,680 of which 1,892 (51%) were males and 1,790 (49%) were females. Population below 6 years was 484. The total number of literates in Baratala was 2,648 (82.80% of the population over 6 years).

Transport
Baratala is on the Lalat-Janka Road.

Education
Khejuri College at Baratala was established in 1999. In addition to courses in arts, it offers a course in Aquaculture Management and Technology.

References

Villages in Purba Medinipur district